Nor Serount Cultural Association is an Armenian cultural organization with several branches throughout the world. First established in 1954 in Beirut, Lebanon, the association is a cultural branch of the Social Democrat Hunchakian Party. Its founding members were Manuel Atamian, Hrant Kankrouni, Sarkis Khayian, Kapriel Moloyan, Jirair Nayiri, Hagop Norashkharian (Norouni), and Bebo Simonian. The organization aims to promote and preserve Armenian culture in the Armenian diaspora. Some of its activities include folk dancing, radio stations, book presentations, and art exhibitions. Considered one of the leading Armenian cultural associations in the Armenian Diaspora, the organization has numerous branches throughout the world including Aleppo, Damascus, Cairo, London, Sydney, Toronto, Montreal, Los Angeles, and others.

See also
Hamazkayin

References

External links
Nor Serount Cultural Association official website
The Sydney Australia branch of Nor Serount Dance Group performing (YouTube video)
The Sydney Australia branch of Nor Serount Dance Group performing Kochari, an Armenian folkloric dance (YouTube video)

Armenian culture
Armenian diaspora in the Middle East
Armenian nationalism
Organizations established in 1954
Organizations based in California
Social Democrat Hunchakian Party